This is a list of various Logitech products. Individual products may have their own article.

Software
Old software may be retrieved from the Logitech Tech Support FTP server, but one should always try Logitech's web site first.

 Logitech MouseWare
 Logitech SetPoint
 Logitech Unifying Software
 Logitech Control Center (LCC)  Compatible: macOS 10.8-11.0. 
 Logitech Options  Compatible: Windows 7 or later, macOS 10.8 or later.

 Logitech Options+ Compatible: Windows 10 or later, macOS 10.15 or later.
 Logitech Gaming Software  Compatible: Windows 7 or later, macOS 10.8-10.15.
 Logitech G Hub  Compatible: Windows 7 or later, macOS 10.13 or later.

Pointing devices

Ball mice

Optical mice

Notes:

Gaming mice

Trackballs

Notes:

Touchpads

Cordless presenters

3D controllers

Notes:

Other pointing devices

Keyboards

Gaming keyboards

Full-sized keyboards

Mobile keyboards

Numeric pads

Game controllers

Gamepads

Joysticks

Racing wheels

Webcams and cameras

Webcams

Digital cameras

Audio products

PC speakers

Headphones

Gaming headphones

*DTS:X Only Headphones can utilize Windows Sonic for Headphones or Dolby Atmos for Headphones when using the generic "USB Audio Device" drivers.

Speaker docks

Sound cards

Remotes

Keyboard and mice combos

Other

Scanners
 Logitech ScanMan (1989) -- Hand-held, binary gray-scale scanner; connector: ISA adapter card (PC).
 Logitech ScanMan 32—Hand-held, 32 gray-scale scanner; connector: ISA adapter card (PC), DB-25F (Mac).
 Logitech ScanMan II (1991) -- Portable, hand-held scanner; connector: DB-25F; M/N S-SMA2.
 Logitech ScanMan EasyTouch—Portable, hand-held, 256 gray-scale scanner, 400 DPI; connector: DB-25F; M/N 0055.
 Logitech ScanMan 256 (1992) -- Hand-held, 256 gray-scale scanner; connector: DB-25F; M/N 0058.
 Logitech ScanMan Color—Hand-held, color scanner, 400 DPI; connector: DB-25F; M/N 5102.
 Logitech ScanMan Color 2000 (1996) -- Hand-held, 24bit color scanner, 400x800 DPI (1600x1600 DPI interpolated); connector: DB-25F or DB-36F Centronics.
 Logitech ScanMan PowerPage—Full-page, sheet-fed scanner.
 Logitech ScanMan PageScan Color—Full-page, sheet-fed, 24bit color scanner, 400 DPI; connector: DB-25F; M/N F-MA4.

Writing instruments 
 Logitech io (2002) -- Personal Digital Pen, ballpoint pen that records the hand written text.
 Logitech io2 (2004) -- Digital Writing System, ballpoint pen that records the hand written text.

Notebook stands
 Logitech Alto Connect (2007) -- X-shaped notebook Stand with four port USB hub built-in.
 Logitech Alto Express (2007) -- Clear plastic notebook stand.

Notebook cases
 Kinetik 15.4 Backpack (2007)
 Kinetik 15.4 Briefcase (2007)

Video security systems
 Logitech Wilife

Hubs
 Logitech Premium 4-port USB hub (2007)

Video game consoles
Logitech G CLOUD Gaming Handheld (2022)

See also
Squeezebox
3Dconnexion

References

Further reading
  (NB. Has various information how to detect different mouse types.)

External links
 

Lists of products
 
Computer peripherals
Computing-related lists
Products by individual company